Mary Pikul Anderson is a hydrologist, geologist, and professor emerita of hydrogeology.  She is a fellow of the Geological Society of America, the American Geophysical Union, and the National Academy of Engineering.

Early life and education 
Anderson was born September 30, 1948 in Buffalo, New York. She received a B.A. degree at the State University of New York at Buffalo in 1970. She earned an M.S. in 1971 and a PhD in 1973 from Stanford University. After a brief time at Southampton College of Long Island University, she joined the faculty of the University of Wisconsin–Madison in 1975 where she was promoted to professor in 1985.

Anderson was elected as a member into the National Academy of Engineering in 2006 for leadership in the development of groundwater-flow models. Anderson also served as president of the Hydrology Section of the American Geophysical Union from 1996 until 1998, and was the Editor-in-Chief of the journal Groundwater from 2002 until 2005.

Research 
Anderson's research involves groundwater–lake interaction and application of computer models.

She is co-author of two textbooks including Introduction to Groundwater Modeling and Applied Groundwater Modeling, now in a 2nd edition (2015). She has been cited as turning groundwater modeling into a "fundamental tool of practicing hydrologists."

Selected publications

Awards and honors 
M. King Hubbert Award of the Association of Groundwater Scientists and Engineers and the National Ground Water Association (1992)
O.E. Meinzer Award, Geological Society of America (1998)
Fellow, Geological Society of America 
Fellow, American Geophysical Union (1999)
C.V. Theis Award, American Institute of Hydrology (2000)
Elected member, National Academy of Engineering (2006)
Walter Langbein lecture, American Geophysical Union (2007)

References

External links
 

1953 births
Living people
American hydrologists
Hydrogeologists
American women geologists
University at Buffalo alumni
Stanford University alumni
University of Wisconsin–Madison faculty
20th-century American geologists
21st-century American geologists
21st-century American scientists
20th-century American women scientists
21st-century American women scientists
American women academics